Recording Workshop (RECW) is a school that teaches the process of music recording and audio production. It is located seven miles south of Chillicothe, Ohio, USA.

History
Founded in 1977 as "The Recording Workshop", the school was associated with Appalachia Sound Recording Studio. Both entities originated with Joe Waters who had started the recording studio in 1971.

In 1987, Recording Workshop was recognized with a Mix magazine TEC Award Nomination as Outstanding Educational Institution.

Notable lecturers at Recording Workshop include:
 Roger Nichols

Notable graduates of Recording Workshop include:
 Jacquire King
 John Keane
 Thomas "TJ" Johnson
Heba Kadry

Current programs
The primary course offered by Recording Workshop is the "Music Recording & Audio Production CORE Program". This lasts five weeks and provides 180 hours of training. An extension course is the "Music Recording & Audio Production ADVANCED Program". This offers two additional weeks of training, adding 80 more hours of learning experience. Both programs are presented seven times per year.

References 

Audio engineering schools
Schools in Ohio